Paul Bailey (born March 4, 1968) is an American businessman, farmer and politician. He serves as a Republican member of the Tennessee Senate, where he represents District 15. Paul Bailey is most well known for introducing a bill making it a felony to camp on public grounds. This bill has been opposed by nearly all homeless organizations nationwide.

Early life
Paul Bailey was born on March 4, 1968. He was educated at White County High School in Sparta, Tennessee. He graduated from Tennessee Tech.

Career
Bailey has been the general manager and vice president of Charles Bailey Trucking, Inc., a trucking company headquartered in Cookeville, Tennessee, for nearly three decades. He is also a farmer.

Bailey serves as a Republican member of the Tennessee Senate, where he represents District 15, encompassing Cumberland, Jackson, Overton, Bledsoe, Putnam, and White Counties.

Bailey serves as the vice chairman of the National Reined Cow Horse Association. He is a member of the National Rifle Association.

Personal life
With his wife Amy, Bailey has three children. Jordan Bailey, Korry Cole, and youngest Caleb Bailey. They reside in White County, Tennessee. He is a Christian.

References

Living people
1968 births
People from White County, Tennessee
Tennessee Technological University alumni
Businesspeople from Tennessee
Republican Party Tennessee state senators
21st-century American politicians